Barış-Fahri Atik (born 9 January 1995) is a Turkish professional footballer who plays as an attacking midfielder for 1. FC Magdeburg.

International career
Atik was born in Germany to parents of Turkish descent. He was a youth international for Turkey at the U18 and 19 levels.

Career statistics

References

External links
 
 

1995 births
Living people
People from Frankenthal
German people of Turkish descent
Turkish footballers
German footballers
Footballers from Rhineland-Palatinate
Association football midfielders
Turkey youth international footballers
TSG 1899 Hoffenheim II players
TSG 1899 Hoffenheim players
SK Sturm Graz players
1. FC Kaiserslautern players
SV Darmstadt 98 players
Dynamo Dresden players
1. FC Magdeburg players
Bundesliga players
Austrian Football Bundesliga players
2. Bundesliga players
3. Liga players
Turkish expatriate footballers
Turkish expatriate sportspeople in Germany
Expatriate footballers in Germany
Turkish expatriate sportspeople in Austria
Expatriate footballers in Austria